Hans Tjebbe Kruize (born 23 May 1954) is a former field hockey player from the Netherlands. He participated in the 1976 and 1984 Olympic Games and ended up in fourth and in sixth place, respectively. Just like his brothers Ties and Hidde, and his father Roepie, he played club hockey for HC Klein Zwitserland from The Hague. The midfielder earned a total number of 99 caps, scoring fourteen goals, in the years 1974–1984. He won a European title in 1974.

References

External links
 

1954 births
Living people
Dutch male field hockey players
Olympic field hockey players of the Netherlands
Field hockey players at the 1976 Summer Olympics
Field hockey players at the 1984 Summer Olympics
Field hockey players from The Hague
HC Klein Zwitserland players
20th-century Dutch people
21st-century Dutch people